The Kenora Light Infantry was an infantry regiment of the Non-Permanent Active Militia of the Canadian Militia (now the Canadian Army). In 1936, the regiment was converted to artillery (currently the 116th Independent Field Battery, RCA).

Lineage

The Kenora Light Infantry 

 Originated on 1 April 1908, in Kenora, Ontario, as the 98th Regiment.
 Redesignated on 12 March 1920, as The Rainy River and Kenora Regiment.
 Redesignated on 1 September 1921, as The Kenora Light Infantry.
 Converted to Artillery on 15 December 1936, and Reorganised as two artillery batteries: the 16th Medium Battery (Howitzer), RCA (currently the 116th Independent Field Battery, RCA) and the 17th Medium Battery (Howitzer), RCA (disbanded on 31 March 1946).

Perpetuations 

 94th Battalion (New Ontario), CEF

History

The First World War 
On 6 August 1914, Details from the 98th Regiment were placed on active service for local protection duties.

On 22 December 1915, the 94th Battalion (New Ontario), CEF was authorized for service and on 28 June 1916, the battalion embarked for Great Britain. After its arrival in the UK, on 18 July 1916, the battalion's personnel were absorbed by the 17th Reserve Battalion, CEF and the 32nd Battalion, CEF to provide reinforcements for the Canadian Corps in the field. On 27 July 1918, the 94th Battalion, CEF was disbanded.

Organization

98th Regiment 
(1 April 1908)

 A Company (Fort Francis, Ontario) (redesignation of E Coy, 96th Regiment)
 B Company (Kenora, Ontario) (redesignation of F Coy, 96th Regiment)
 C Company (Kenora, Ontario) (raised on 1 April 1908)
 D Company (Rainy River, Ontario) (raised on 1 April 1908)

The Rainy River and Kenora Regiment 
1st Battalion, The Rainy River and Kenora Regiment (1 June 1921)

 A Company (Kenora, Ontario)
 B Company
 C Company
 D Company (Rainy River, Ontario)

Battle honours 

 Somme, 1916
 Arras, 1917, 18
 Hill 70
 Ypres, 1917
 Amiens
 Hindenburg Line
 Pursuit to Mons

Notes and references 

Former infantry regiments of Canada
Light Infantry regiments of Canada
Military units and formations of Ontario